Victoria Garden City is a gated community (estate) off Lekki Express Way, Ajah area, Lagos State. It spans approximately 200 hectares and serves as a residential, commercial and public service area. It is owned and operated by HFP, a construction company. It is privately owned with an urban growth rate of between 16% to 18%.

The community is perfectly furnished with modern infrastructure and lies along the Lekki-Epe Expressway. It boasts of a good road network, round the clock security, recreational park, bank (First Bank PLC), school (Chrisland Schools), churches, a mosque, 24 hours water treatment and supply and a shopping complex.

Management 
The body that sees to the overall maintenance and management of Victoria Garden City is known as the VMMCL (VGC Maintenance and Management Company Limited).

References

Lekki
Mixed-use developments in Lagos
Neighborhoods of Lagos
Housing estates in Lagos